Alessandro Carafa (died 1503) was a Roman Catholic prelate who served as Archbishop of Naples (1484–1503).

Biography
On 20 Sep 1484, Alessandro Carafa was appointed during the papacy of Pope Innocent VIII as Archbishop of Naples.
He served as Archbishop of Naples until his death on 31 Jul 1503.

References 

15th-century Italian Roman Catholic bishops
16th-century Italian Roman Catholic bishops
Bishops appointed by Pope Innocent VIII
1503 deaths